Mehrian (also Romanized as Mehrīān, Mehreyān, and Mehriyan; also known as Mehrūyān) is a village in Rahmatabad Rural District, Zarqan District, Shiraz County, Fars Province, Iran. At the 2006 census, its population was 757, in 189 families.

References 

Populated places in Zarqan County